The women's 3000 metres steeplechase event at the 2011 All-Africa Games was held on 13 September.

Results

References
Results
Results

3000
2011 in women's athletics